The 2005 Formula 3 Sudamericana season was the 19th Formula 3 Sudamericana season. It began on 12 March 2005, at  Autódromo Internacional de Curitiba and ended on 11 December at Autódromo José Carlos Pace in São Paulo. Brazilian driver Alberto Valério won the title.

Drivers and teams
 All drivers competed in Pirelli-shod.

References

External links
 Official website

Formula 3 Sudamericana
Sudamericana
Formula 3 Sudamericana seasons
Sudamericana F3